Cindy Tolan is an American casting director and producer. Her career began in theatre, before she transitioned to television and film. She was awarded a BAFTA for her work as casting director of West Side Story in 2021. For the film she auditioned 30,000 people in order to create an authentic cast with performers of Latin descent. She is credited with the discovery of Rachel Zegler and for encouraging Ariana DeBose to audition. In 2019 she was nominated for two Black Reel Awards for different films, competing with herself in the Best Ensemble category for If Beale Street Could Talk and Sorry to Bother You. In 2018 she awarded an Emmy for her work on The Marvelous Mrs Maisel: Tolan was part of a team who cast the first season, but subsequently was the sole casting director for seasons two and three. She is a member of the Casting Society of America.

Awards and nominations 
 Artios Award: Big Budget Drama - 2023 - The Fabelmans (nominee)
 BAFTA Award for Best Casting - 2021 - West Side Story (winner)
 Emmy: Outstanding Casting For A Comedy Series - 2020 - The Marvelous Mrs Maisel (nominee)
 Emmy: Outstanding Casting For A Comedy Series - 2019 - The Marvelous Mrs Maisel (nominee)
 Emmy: Outstanding Casting For A Comedy Series - 2018 - The Marvelous Mrs Maisel (winner)
 Black Reel Awards: Best Cast (ensemble) - 2016 - Straight Outta Compton (winner)
 Artios Award: Best Feature Film Casting - 2007 - The Namesake (nominee)

Selected filmography 

 The Fabelmans (2022)
 West Side Story (2021)
 If Beale Street Could Talk (2018)
 Wildling (2017)
 Straight Outta Compton (2015)
 Maggie's Plan (2015)
 This Is Where I Leave You (2014)
 A Winter's Tale (2014)
 Mississippi Grind (2014)
 The Place Beyond The Pines (2013)
 The Reluctant Fundamentalist (2013)
 The Namesake (2006)

References

External links 

 
 Press photographs of Tolan

Living people
Year of birth missing (living people)
American casting directors
Women casting directors